The 1808 Connecticut gubernatorial election took place on April 14, 1808. Incumbent Federalist Governor Jonathan Trumbull Jr. won re-election to an eleventh full term, defeating Democratic-Republican candidate William Hart in a re-match of the previous year's election.

Results

References

Notes 

Gubernatorial
Connecticut
1808